Romeo and Juliet is an outdoor bronze sculpture depicting Romeo and Juliet by American artist Milton Hebald, located in front of Delacorte Theater in Manhattan's Central Park, in the United States. It is one of two companion works at the theater sculpted by Hebald, the other being The Tempest (1966). A cast from the same mold appears in the rose garden at the Hollenbeck Palms retirement community in Boyle Heights, Los Angeles.

See also
 1978 in art

References

External links
 Romeo and Juliet by David Berger (November 23, 2009), Central Park's Artist Sculptures

1978 establishments in New York City
1978 sculptures
Boyle Heights, Los Angeles
Bronze sculptures in California
Bronze sculptures in Central Park
Outdoor sculptures in Greater Los Angeles
Outdoor sculptures in Manhattan
Statues in New York City
Statues of fictional characters
Works based on Romeo and Juliet